Francis Charles Roth (October 11, 1878 – March 27, 1955) was an American professional baseball catcher. He played in Major League Baseball (MLB) from 1903 to 1910 for the Philadelphia Phillies, St. Louis Browns, Chicago White Sox, and Cincinnati Reds.

Roth's brother was former Major League outfielder Braggo Roth.

Sources

Major League Baseball catchers
Philadelphia Phillies players
St. Louis Browns players
Chicago White Sox players
Cincinnati Reds players
New York Yankees coaches
Chicago White Sox coaches
Cleveland Indians coaches
Sioux City Cornhuskers players
Cedar Rapids Rabbitts players
Evansville River Rats players
Battle Creek Cero Frutos players
St. Joseph Saints players
Indianapolis Indians players
Milwaukee Brewers (minor league) players
Montreal Royals players
Buffalo Bisons (minor league) players
Louisville Colonels (minor league) players
Baseball players from Illinois
1878 births
1955 deaths